3D Sex and Zen: Extreme Ecstasy is a 2011 Hong Kong 3D erotic costume drama film directed by Christopher Suen and produced by Stephen Shiu. It was released in Hong Kong, South Korea, Australia and New Zealand on 14 April 2011. It is a new instalment of the Sex and Zen series and is loosely based on the 17th century Chinese novel The Carnal Prayer Mat. As compared to the original film series, it is more dark and dramatic, and it occasionally pays homage to the humour of the earlier films.

Plot
A conceited Ming dynasty scholar, Weiyangsheng, believes that since life is short, one should pursue the ultimate sexual pleasure as time permits. By chance, he meets Yuxiang, the daughter of the Taoist priest Tie Fei, falls in love with her on first sight, and marries her. Yuxiang is elegant and courteous under the influence of her father's faith, though her lack of passion cannot fully satisfy Weiyangsheng's sexual needs. His disappointment is no less than his affection for her. He ventures in search of ways to increase his sex drive and performance in bed.

Cast
 Hiro Hayama as Weiyangsheng
 Lan Yan as Tie Yuxiang
 Saori Hara as Ruizhu
 Vonnie Lui as the Elder of Bliss
 Yukiko Suo as Dongmei
 Irene Chen as Pandan
 Tony Ho as Prince Ning
 Kirt Kishita as Quan Laoshi
  as Monk Budai
 Tenky Tin as Dique
 Justin Cheung as Mr Lam
 Carina Chen as Xianlan, Tie Yuxiang's maid
 Jason Yiu as Shangguan Shen
 Lau Shek-yin as the Mayor
 Mark Wu as Tiancan
 Naami Hasegawa (Tomoko Kinoshita)
 Vienna Lin
 Flora Cheung as Xiang, Tie Yuxiang's maid
 Cliff Chen
 Jeffrey Chow
 Wah Chiu-ho

Background
3D Sex and Zen: Extreme Ecstasy is essentially an adaptation of the novel The Carnal Prayer Mat depicting the sexual exploits of Weiyangsheng, a young Ming dynasty scholar. It is produced by Stephen Shiu, the executive producer of Sex and Zen. The film was incorrectly promoted as "Hong Kong's first IMAX 3-D erotic film" because it was actually rejected by IMAX due to its subject matter and content. Its cast includes Japanese AV idols. Laughing aloud, Shiu described the experience of watching this film onscreen: "It is just like [being a] voyeur near someone's bed."

Distribution
The film is a Category III film as per Hong Kong rating and Stephen Shiu said that screening was likely to be blocked in mainland China, a key market for Hong Kong filmmakers. Nevertheless, the producers further announced that 3D Sex and Zen will be released in various versions to bypass censorship laws in some jurisdictions and allow wider distribution.

In Australia and New Zealand, the film was screened by Hoyts.

Marketing
During the Chinese New Year in 2011, T-shirts and 3-D mouse pads with portraits of the cast were sold at the Lunar New Year Fair in Victoria Park, Hong Kong.

Reception
3D Sex and Zen: Extreme Ecstasy received mostly negative reviews from critics. Review aggregator Rotten Tomatoes reports that 22% of critics gave the film positive reviews, based on 23 reviews.

Simon Foster of SBS Australia suggested the film loses steam along the way. He believes the thrill of the movie dissipates as the narrative turns nasty at the final 40 minutes, caused by those multi-dimensional rape and dismemberment scenes. Elizabeth Kerr of The Hollywood Reporter wrote, "Given Extreme Ecstasys ultimate message that "All you need is love" and the vindication of the value of emotional connection in intercourse, the road the filmmakers take to get there is perplexing to say the least." The Daily Telegraph named it one of the ten worst films of the year, citing "the film goes on for too long, and gets darker as it does so, veering awfully close to torture porn on occasion, before ending with some unexpectedly sentimental philosophy that will be anathema to the manufacturers of Viagra."

However, Zoe Li of CNNGo gave the film a positive review. "I walked out of the first private screening of the softcore 3D Sex and Zen: Extreme Ecstasy never wanting to have sex again, not because the sex scenes were gross... but because its message of 'true love doesn't need sex' was so convincing", she states. Simon Miraudo suggested on his Quickflix blog that the movie heralded a new age in cinema.

Box office
According to Russell Edwards of Variety, 3D Sex and Zen: Extreme Ecstasy took in US$351,000 (HK$2,790,000) on the first day alone in Hong Kong, beating Avatar'''s HK$2.5 million opening gross in the country in 2009. It earned HK$13,104,982 in the first four days after opening.

As of 15 June 2011, 3D Sex and Zen: Extreme Ecstasy'' earned more than HK$40 million (over US$5M) in Hong Kong.

References

External links
 
 
 
 
 
 
 3D Sex and Zen at Hong Kong Movie Database
 3D Sex and Zen at Hong Kong Cinemagic

Sex and Zen
2011 films
2011 3D films
2010s Cantonese-language films
2010s erotic films
Hong Kong 3D films
Works based on The Carnal Prayer Mat
Hong Kong erotic films
2010s Hong Kong films